Barbara Lezzi (born 24 April 1972 in Lecce) is an Italian politician, who served in the government of Italy as Minister for the South from 1 June 2018 until 5 September 2019.

Biography
Barbara Lezzi was born in Lecce on 24 April 1972. She took a diploma at the Commercial Technical Institute "Deledda" of Lecce and in 1992 she was taken as an employee by a company in the commerce sector.

Political career
She was elected Senator for the first time in the 2013 Italian general election. Subsequently, she became Vice-Chairman of the Standing Committee on Budget and Economic Planning and member of the Standing Committee on European Policies. She was re-elected Senator in the 2018 general election.

On 1 June 2018 she was appointed Minister for Southern Italy of the Conte Cabinet.

Personal life 
Lezzi married Rocco Zaminga, an accountant. She gave birth to a son in 2016 named Cristiano Attila.

References

21st-century Italian women politicians
1972 births
People from Lecce
Five Star Movement politicians
Senators of Legislature XVII of Italy
Senators of Legislature XVIII of Italy
Women government ministers of Italy
Living people
Conte I Cabinet
20th-century Italian women
Women members of the Senate of the Republic (Italy)